Lozowick is a surname. Notable people with the surname include:

 Lee Lozowick, American spiritual teacher, author, poet, lyricist and singer
 Louis Lozowick, American painter and printmaker
 Yaacov Lozowick, German-born Israeli historian and writer

See also
 Lodowick, a surname